Wakka may refer to:

 Wakka (Final Fantasy), a character from the Final Fantasy X video game
 Wakka Wakka, an Australian Aboriginal nation of south-east Queensland
 , an open source wiki engine
 Uakazuwaka Kazombiaze (born 1979), also known as Wakka Kazombiaze, Namibian rugby union player

See also 
 Waka (disambiguation)
 Waka waka (disambiguation)

th:วักก้า